Acanthurus olivaceus, also known as the orange-band surgeonfish, the orange-shoulder surgeonfish or the  orangebar tang, is a member of the family Acanthuridae, the surgeonfishes. It lives in the tropical waters of the Indo-west Pacific.

Description
Both dorsal and anal fins are long and low, extending as far as the caudal peduncle. The dorsal fin has nine spines and 23 to 25 soft rays while the anal fin has three spines and 22 to 24 soft rays. The tail fin is crescent-shaped, the points growing longer as the fish gets older. The adult fish is greyish-brown; a sharp vertical line usually separates the paler front half of the fish from the darker hind portion. There is a distinctive orange bar, surrounded by a purplish-black margin, immediately behind the top of the gill cover, and blue and orange lines at the bases of the fins. Like all surgeonfish, this species has a pair of scalpel-like scales that project upward from the caudal peduncle. Larger males develop a convex snout which clearly differentiates them from females. Juvenile fish are yellow.

Distribution and habitat
This fish is found in the tropical eastern Indian Ocean and the western Pacific Ocean. Its range extends from Christmas Island and the Cocos Keeling Islands to southern Japan, Western, Northern and Eastern Australia, Indonesia, the Philippines and Hawaii. It is associated with reefs, often on outer slopes and in more exposed locations.

Ecology
The orange band surgeonfish feeds on detritus and on algae growing on the seabed, as well as the film of diatoms and filamentous algae that grows on sand and other substrates. It often forms schools with parrotfish, tangs and other species of surgeonfish, which all have similar diets; their grazing is important in maintaining biodiversity by keeping rocks free from excessive growth of algae so that coral larvae can find suitable habitat to settle. The fish can change colour from dark to pale almost instantaneously.

Status
The orange band surgeonfish has a wide distribution in the tropical Indo-Pacific region and is moderately common. It is sometimes found in fish markets and in the aquarium trade but is not a species targeted by fisheries. No particular threats have been recognised, so the International Union for Conservation of Nature has listed its conservation status as being of least concern.

References

External links

 Orangespot Tang care sheet at FishGeeks
 Encyclopedia of Life: Acanthurus olivaceus (Orange Shoulder Tang)
 

Acanthurus
Fish of Hawaii
Fish described in 1801